Cosmopterix javanica is a moth in the family Cosmopterigidae. It was described by Kuroko in 2011. It is found on Java.

References

Natural History Museum Lepidoptera generic names catalog

Moths described in 2011
javanica